Ryabki is the name of several rural localities in Russia:
Ryabki, Novgorod Oblast, a village in Yazhelbitskoye Settlement of Valdaysky District of Novgorod Oblast
Ryabki, Perm Krai, a selo in Chernushinsky District of Perm Krai